Richard Halworth Rovere (May 5, 1915 – November 23, 1979) was an American political journalist.

Biography
Rovere was born in Jersey City, New Jersey. He graduated from The Stony Brook School in 1933 and Bard College, then a branch of Columbia University, in 1937.  During the Great Depression, he joined the Communist movement and wrote for the New Masses.  In 1939, as a result of the Molotov–Ribbentrop Pact, he broke with Stalinism and became an anticommunist liberal.

In the early 1940s, he was an assistant editor at The Nation. He joined The New Yorker in 1944 and wrote its "Letter from Washington" column from December 1948 until his death. Throughout the 1940s and 1950s, he periodically contributed to Esquire, Harper's, and The American Scholar; now and then he reported on American matters for Britain's Spectator. His reporting got him on the master list of Nixon political opponents.

He died of emphysema in Poughkeepsie, New York.

Blurbs
From the Rhinebeck Gazette (Rhinebeck, New York), June 18, 1959:

The Gazette received an advanced copy of Richard H. Rovere's book, "Senator Joe McCarthy," from Harcourt, Brace and Company, Inc.  The book is both an analytical biography and a memoir, as well as a commentary on the American political scene.  Mr Rovere, who was often an eyewitness observer of the events he describes, lives at 108 Montgomery Street in Rhinebeck.

Legacy
His papers from 1931 to 1968 are housed at the Wisconsin Historical Society Archives.

Bibliography
Howe & Hummel: Their True and Scandalous History (1947)
The General and the President (with Arthur M. Schlesinger, Jr., 1951)
Affairs of State: The Eisenhower Years (1956)
Senator Joe McCarthy (1959)
The American Establishment and Other Reports, Opinions, and Speculations (1962)
The Goldwater Caper (1965)
Waist Deep in the Big Muddy: Personal Reflections on 1968 (1968)
Arrivals and Departures: A Journalist's Memoirs (1976)
 Final Reports: Personal Reflections on Politics and History in Our Time (1984, published posthumously, foreword by Arthur M. Schlesinger, Jr.)

References

Further reading
Allen, Frederick Lewis (April 1944). Personal & Otherwise: Honorable Mixed Fry. Harper's, pgs. 488–490.
Logan, Andy.  (December 10, 1979).  Obituary: Richard Rovere. The New Yorker, pgs. 218–219.

External links
  The American Establishment and Other Reports, Opinions, and Speculations from Archive.org
  The Goldwater Caper from Archive.org

1915 births
1979 deaths
The New Yorker people
The Stony Brook School alumni
Writers from Jersey City, New Jersey
20th-century American writers
20th-century American journalists
American male journalists